Ayşegül Çoban (born 16 December 1992) is a Turkish weightlifter competing in the – 53 kg division. She is a native of Konya.

Personal life
Ayşegül was born on 16 December 1992 to Ali and Döndü Çoban. Due to the family's limited economic situation, Çoban was enrolled in a foster boarding school to receive a better education.

In the school, she showed interest in weightlifting, and began with exercise promoted by her teacher of physical education, Sibel Ünlü, wife of the Turkey national weightlifting team's head coach Talat Ünlü.

She lives in the Aydınlıkevler neighborhood of the Selçuklu district in Konya Province with her parents. Çoban studies at the School of Physical Education and Sports of the Selçuk University in Konya.

Career
Ayşegül Çoban was admitted to the national team in 2007. She became 15-times national champion. In 2007, she broke the national record lifting 86 kg in the clean and jerk discipline in her age category.

In 2007, she won the silver medal at the European Youth U17 Championship in Pavia, Italy, and captured the gold medal at the 2008 European Youth Championship in Ameins, France. She repeated her success as champion next year at the 2009 European Youth Championships in Eilat, Israel.

In 2009, Çoban became champion at the European Junior Championship held in Landskrona, Sweden. In 2010, she was again European junior champion in Limassol, Cyprus. At the 2012 European Junior Championships held in Eilat, Israel, she gained the bronze medal.

Ayşegül Çoban won the bronze medal at the 2011 European Weightlifting Championships held in Kazan, Russia. At the 2013 European Weightlifting Championships held in Tirana, Albania, Çoban reached to silver medal in the clean&jerk discipline of the -53 kg event that sufficed only to a fourth rank in total. At the 2013 Summer Universiade in Kazan, Russia, she won the bronze medal in the -53 kg division.

Ayşegül Coban achieved first place in the women's 53 kg class at the 17th Mediterranean Games in Mersin, Turkey, on 20 June 2013, with 82 kg Snatch, 110 Clean and Jerk, with 192 kg total.

On 16 October 2013, Ayşegül Coban competed in the 53 kg women's class at the 2013 IWF World Championships in Wroclaw, Poland.  She successfully lifted 77 kg in the Snatch, but did not achieve a successful lift in the Clean and Jerk.

Achievements
European Youth U17 Championships

European Junior Championships

European Championships

Summer Universiade

Mediterranean Games

References

External links
International Weightlifting Federation

1992 births
Living people
Turkish female weightlifters
Sportspeople from Konya
Selçuk University alumni
European champions for Turkey
Universiade medalists in weightlifting
Mediterranean Games gold medalists for Turkey
Mediterranean Games silver medalists for Turkey
Mediterranean Games medalists in weightlifting
Competitors at the 2013 Mediterranean Games
Universiade bronze medalists for Turkey
European Weightlifting Championships medalists
Medalists at the 2013 Summer Universiade
21st-century Turkish sportswomen